Below is an alphabetical list of widely used and repeated proverbial phrases. Whenever known, the origin of the phrase or proverb is noted.

A proverbial phrase or a proverbial expression is a type of conventional saying similar to proverbs and transmitted by oral tradition. The difference is that a proverb is a fixed expression, while a proverbial phrase permits alterations to fit the grammar of the context.

In 1768, John Ray defined a proverbial phrase as:

A
 A bad excuse is better than none
 A bad penny always turns up
 A bad workman blames his tools
 A bird in the hand is worth two in the bush
 A cat may look at a king
 A chain is only as strong as its weakest link
 A dog is a man's best friend
 A fool and his money are soon parted
 A friend in need (is a friend indeed)
 A friend to everyone is a friend to no one
 A journey of a thousand miles begins with a single step
 A little learning is a dangerous thing
 A leopard cannot change its spots
 A mill cannot grind with the water that is past
 A miss is as good as a mile
 A new language is a new life (Persian proverb)
 A penny saved is a penny earned
 A picture is worth a thousand words
 A rising tide lifts all boats
 A rolling stone gathers no moss
 A ship  in a harbour is safe, but that's not what a ship is for
 A stitch in time (saves nine)
 A watched man never plays
 A watched pot/kettle never boils
 Absence makes the heart grow fonder
 Absolute power corrupts absolutely (John Dalberg-Acton, 1887)
 Accidents will happen (in the best-regulated families)
 Actions speak louder than words
 Adversity makes strange bedfellows
 All good things come to him who waits
 All good things must come to an end
 All hands on deck/to the pump
 All is grist that comes to the mill
 All roads lead to Rome
 All that glitters/glistens is not gold
 All the world loves a lover
 All things come to those who wait
 All things must pass
 All work and no play makes Jack a dull boy
 All you need is love
 All is fair in love and war
 All is for the best in the best of all possible worlds
 All is well that ends well
 An apple a day keeps the doctor away
 An army marches on its stomach 
 An eye for an eye makes the whole world blind (Mahatma Gandhi (1869–1948), leader of the Indian independence movement)
 An Englishman's home is his castle/A man's home is his castle
 Another day, another dollar
 Another happy landing
 An ounce of prevention is worth a pound of cure
 Any port in a storm
 Any publicity is good publicity
 April showers bring forth May flowers
 As a tree bends, so shall it grow
 As you make your bed, so you must lie upon it
 As you sow so shall you reap
 Ask a silly question and you will get a silly answer
 Ask my companion if I be a thief
 Ask no questions and hear no lies
 Attack is the best form of defense
 At the end of my rope

B
 Bad news travels fast
 Barking dogs seldom bite
 Beauty is in the eye of the beholder
 Beauty is only skin deep
 Beggars cannot be choosers
 Behind every great man, there is a great woman
 Better late than never
 Better safe than sorry
 Better to reign in hell than serve in heaven
 Be yourself
 Better the Devil you know (than the Devil you do not)
 Better to have loved and lost than never to have loved at all
 Better to light one candle than to curse the darkness
 Better to remain silent and be thought a fool than to speak and remove all doubt
 Better wear out than rust out
 Beware of Greeks bearing gifts (Trojan War, Virgil in the Aeneid)
 Big fish eat little fish
 Birds of a feather (flock together)
 Blood is thicker than water
 Born with a silver spoon in one's mouth
 Boys will be boys
 Brevity is the soul of wit (William Shakespeare)
 Business before pleasure

C
 Caesar's wife must be above suspicion
 Careless talk costs lives
 Charity begins at home
 Cheats never prosper
 Cheese, wine, and friends must be old to be good.
 Children should be seen and not heard
 Christmas comes but once a year
 Cleanliness is next to godliness
 Clothes don't make the man
 Clothes make the man
 Coffee and love taste best when hot. Ethiopian proverb
 Cold hands, warm heart
 Comparisons are odious
 Count your blessings
 Courage is the measure of a Man, Beauty is the measure of a Woman
 Cowards may die many times before their death
 Crime does not pay
 Criss-cross, applesauce
 Cross the stream where it is shallowest
 Cut your coat according to your cloth
 Curiosity killed the cat

D
 Dead men tell no tales
 Denial is not a river in Egypt
 Devil take the hindmost
 Discretion is the better part of valour
 Do as I say, not as I do
 Do as you would be done by
 Do unto others as you would have them do unto you
 Do not bite the hand that feeds you
 Do not burn your bridges behind you
 Do not carry coals to Newcastle
 Do not cast your pearls before swine
 Do not cry over spilled milk
 Do not change horses in midstream
 Do not count your chickens before they are hatched
 Do not cross the bridge till you come to it
 Do not cut off your nose to spite your face
 Do not judge a book by its cover
 Do not keep a dog and bark yourself
 Do not let the bastards grind you down
 Do not let the grass grow beneath (one's) feet
 Do not look a gift horse in the mouth
 Do not make a mountain out of a mole hill
 Do not meet troubles half-way
 Do not put all your eggs in one basket
 Do not put the cart before the horse
 Do not put too many irons in the fire
 Do not put new wine into old bottles
 Do not put off until tomorrow what you can do today
 Do not rock the boat
 Do not shut/lock the stable door after the horse has bolted
 Do not spend it all in one place
 Do not spoil the ship for a ha'porth of tar
 Do not throw pearls to swine
 Do not teach your Grandmother to suck eggs
 Do not throw the baby out with the bathwater
 Do not try to walk before you can crawl
 Do not upset the apple-cart
 Do not wash your dirty linen in public
 Do not sympathize with those who can not empathize
 Do unto others as you would have them do unto you. Often referred to as the Golden Rule
 Doubt is the beginning, not the end, of wisdom

E
 Early to bed and early to rise makes a man healthy, wealthy and wise (Benjamin Franklin (1706–1790), polymath and Founding Father of the United States) 
 Easier said than done
 East is east, and west is west (and never the twain shall meet)
 East, west, home is best
 Easy come, easy go
 Easy, times easy, is still easy
 Early marriage, earlier pregnant
 Eat breakfast like a king, lunch like a prince and dinner like a pauper
 Eat, drink and be merry, (for tomorrow we die)
 Empty vessels make the most noise
 Enough is as good as a feast
 Even a worm will turn
 Even from a foe a man may learn wisdom
 Every cloud has a silver lining
 Every dog has his day
 Every Jack has his Jill
 Every little bit helps
 Every man for himself (and the Devil take the hindmost)
 Every man has his price
 Every picture tells a story
 Every stick has two ends
 Everybody wants to go to heaven but nobody wants to die
 Everyone has their price
 Everything comes to those who wait
 Every tide has its ebb

F
 Failing to plan is planning to fail
 Faint heart never won fair lady (Scott)
 Fair exchange is no robbery
 Faith will move mountains
 Fall seven times, stand up eight
 False friends are worse than open enemies
 Fake it till you make it
 Familiarity breeds contempt
 Feed a cold, starve a fever
 Fight fire with fire
 Fine feathers make fine birds
 Finders keepers (losers weepers)
 Fine words butter no parsnips
 First come, first served
 First impressions are the most lasting
 First things first
 Fish always rots from the head downwards
 Fish and guests smell after three days
 Flattery will get you nowhere
 Fools rush in (where angels fear to tread)
 For want of a nail the shoe was lost; for want of a shoe the horse was lost; and for want of a horse the man was lost
 Forewarned is forearmed
 Fortune favours the bold/brave
 Free is for me
 From the sublime to the ridiculous (is only a step)

G
 Genius is an infinite capacity for taking pains
 Give a dog a bad name and hang him
 Give a man a fish and you feed him for a day. Teach a man to fish and you feed him for a lifetime
 Give a man rope enough and he will hang himself
 Give credit where credit is due
 Give him an inch and he will take a mile
 Give the devil his/her due
 God helps those who help themselves
 Good fences make good neighbours
 Good talk saves the food
 Good things come to those who wait
 Great minds think alike

H
 Half a loaf is better than no bread
 Handsome is as handsome does
 Hard cases make bad law
 Hard work never did anyone any harm
 Haste makes waste
 He that goes a-borrowing, goes a-sorrowing
 He who can, does; he who cannot, teaches
 He who hesitates is lost
 He who laughs last laughs longest
 He who lives by the sword, dies by the sword
 He who loves the world as his body may be entrusted with the empire. Lao Tzu, Chinese philosopher (604 BC – c. 531 BC)
 He who makes a beast out of himself gets rid of the pain of being a man
 He who pays the piper calls the tune
 He who knows does not speak. He who speaks does not know. Lao Tzu, Chinese philosopher (604 BC – c. 531 BC)
 He who sups with the Devil should have a long spoon
 Hell hath no fury like a woman scorned
 Hello there!
 Heav'n has no Rage, like Love to Hatred turn'd, Nor Hell a Fury, like a Woman scorn'd. William Congreve, The Mourning Bride, Act III scene viii
 Hindsight is always twenty-twenty
 History repeats itself
 Home is where the heart is
 Honesty is the best policy
 Hope for the best, and prepare for the worst.
 Hope springs eternal
 Horses for courses
 Hunger never knows the taste, sleep never knows the comfort

I
 Idle hands are the devil's playthings
 If anything can go wrong, it will (Also referred to as Murphy's law)
 If a job is worth doing, it is worth doing well
 If at first you do not succeed, try, try again
 If God had meant us to fly, he would have given us wings
 If ifs and ands were pots and pans, there would be no work for tinkers
 If it ain't broke, don't fix it
 If it were not for hope the heart would break
 If it were a snake, it would have bit you
 If the shoe fits, wear it
 If the mountain will not come to Mohammed, then Mohammed must go to the mountain
 If wealth is lost, nothing is lost. If health is lost, something is lost. If character is lost, everything is lost
 If wishes were horses, beggars would ride
 If you're growing in age, then you're nearing to the graveyard
 If you cannot be good, be careful
 If you cannot beat them, join them
 If you cannot live longer, live deeper
 If you cannot stand the heat, get out of the kitchen
 If you give a mouse a cookie, he'll always ask for a glass of milk
 If you think that you know everything, then you're a Jack ass
 If you lie down with dogs, you will get up with fleas
 If you pay peanuts, you get monkeys
 If you play with fire, you will get burned
 If you steal from one author, it is plagiarism; if you steal from many, it is research (Wilson Mizner (1876–1933), American writer and entrepreneur)
 If you want a thing done well, do it yourself
 If you have never seen the bottom of the tree, you cannot know how tall it stands
 If you must dance with the Devil, you might as well know his favorite song (H. Anthony Ribadeneira)
 If you've got it, flaunt it
 Ignorance is bliss
 Imitation is the sincerest form of flattery
 In for a penny, in for a pound
 (March comes) in like a lion, (and goes) out like a lamb
 In the kingdom of the blind, the one eyed man is king
 In the midst of life, we are in death
 Into every life a little rain must fall
 It ain't over till/until it's over
 It ain't over till the fat lady sings
 It ain't what you don't know that gets you into trouble. It's what you know for sure that just ain’t so
 It goes without saying
 It is a small world
 It is all grist to the mill
 It is an ill wind (that blows no one any good)
 It is best to be on the safe side
 It is better to be smarter than you appear than to appear smarter than you are
 It is better to give than to receive
 It is better to have loved and lost than never to have loved at all
 It is better to cultivate a Land with two Bulls, rather working under Boss who never gives Wage when asked
 It is better to light a candle than curse the darkness
 It is better to travel hopefully than to arrive
 It is easy to be wise after the event
 It's Greek to me
 It is like juggling sand (Ian Murray)
 It is never too late
 It is no use crying over spilt milk
 It is no use locking the stable door after the horse has bolted
 It is not enough to learn how to ride, you must also learn how to fall
 It is on
 It is the early bird that gets the worm
 It is the empty can that makes the most noise
 It is the squeaky wheel that gets the grease
 It is what it is
 It needs a hundred lies to cover a single lie
 It never rains but it pours
 It takes a thief to catch a thief
 It takes a whole village to raise a child
 It takes all sorts to make a world
 It takes one to know one
 It takes two to tango
 I'm going to have to give you the pink slip
 It will come back and haunt you
 It will be the same a hundred years hence
 Islands depend on reeds, just as reeds depend on islands (Myanmar proverbs)

J
 Jack of all trades, master of none/one/some
 Judge not, that ye be not judged

K
 Keep your chin up
 Keep your friends close and your enemies closer
 Keep your powder dry (Valentine Blacker, 1834 from Oliver's Advice)
 Kill the chicken to scare the monkey
 Kill the goose that lays the golden egg(s)
 Kill two birds with one stone.
 Kindness in words creates confidence. Kindness in thinking creates profoundness. Kindness in giving creates love (Lao Tzu, Chinese philosopher, 604 BC – c. 531 BC)
 Knock on (or touch) wood
 Know which side (one's) bread is buttered (on)
 Knowledge is power, guard it well

L
 A language is a dialect with an army and navy
 The last drop makes the cup run over
 Laugh before breakfast, cry before supper.
 Laugh and the world laughs with you, weep and you weep alone
 Laughter is the best medicine
 Late lunch makes day go faster.
 Learn a language, and you will avoid a war. Arab proverb
 Least said, soonest mended
 Less is more
 Let bygones be bygones
 Let not the sun go down on your wrath
 Let sleeping dogs lie
 Let the buyer beware
 Let the cat out of the bag
 Let the dead bury the dead (N.T.)
 Let the punishment fit the crime
 Let well alone
 Let your hair down.
 Life begins at forty
 Life is too short not to do something that matters.
 Life is not all beer and skittles
 Life is what you make it
 Lightning never strikes twice in the same place
 Like father, like son
 Little pitchers have big ears
 Little strokes fell great oaks
 Little things please little minds
 Live and let live
 Live for today, for tomorrow never comes
 Live to fight another day. This saying comes from an English proverbial rhyme, "He who fights and runs away, may live to fight another day".
 Loose lips sink ships
 Look before you leap
 Love is blind. The Two Gentlemen of Verona, Act II, Scene 1 (1591)
 Love of money is the root of all evil.
 Love makes the world go around
 Love will find a way

M
 Make hay while the sun shines
 Make love not war
 Man does not live by bread alone
 Man proposes, heaven disposes
 Manners maketh man
 Many a little makes a mickle
 Many a mickle makes a muckle
 Many a true word is spoken in jest
 Many hands make light work
 March comes in like a lion and goes out like a lamb
 Marriages are made in heaven
 Marry in haste, repent at leisure
 Memory is the treasure of the mind
 Men are blind in their own cause. Heywood Broun (1888–1939), American journalist
 Men get spoiled by staying, Women get spoiled by wandering
 Might is right
 Might makes right
 Mighty oaks from little acorns grow
 Milking the bull
 Misery loves company
 Moderation in all things
 Monday's child is fair of face, Tuesday's child is full of grace, Wednesday's child is full of woe, Thursday's child has far to go, Friday's child is loving and giving, Saturday's child works hard for its living, and a child that is born on the Sabbath day is fair and wise and good and gay.
 Money does not grow on trees
 Money earned by deceit, goes by deceit
 Money is not everything
 Money demands care, you abuse it and it disappears. Rashida Costa
 Money makes the world go around
 Money talks
 Money makes many things, but also makes devil dance
 More haste, less speed
 Mud sticks
 Music has charms to soothe the savage beast

N
 Nature abhors a vacuum
 Necessity is the mother of invention
 Needs must when the devil drives
 Never cast a clout until May be out
 Never give advice unless asked.
 Never give a sucker an even break
 Never judge a book by its cover
 Never let the sun go down on your anger
 Never let the truth get in the way of a good story 
 Never look a gift horse in the mouth
 Never put off until tomorrow what you can do today
 Never reveal a man's wage, and woman's age
 Never speak ill of the dead
 Never say die
 Never say never
 Never tell tales out of school
 Never too old to learn.
 Nine tailors make a man,
 No friends but the mountains
 No guts, no glory
 No man can serve two masters
 No man is an island
 No names, no pack-drill
 No news is good news
 No one can make you feel inferior without your consent
 No pain, no gain
 No rest for the wicked
 Not all those who wander are lost "All that is gold does not glitter" J.R.R. Tolkien (1954)
 Not happy, Jan!
 Nothing is certain but death and taxes
 Nothing succeeds like success,
 Nothing ventured, nothing gained

O
 Oil and water do not mix
 Of course my horse (trademarked by Guadalupe Schmidt-Mumm)
 Old soldiers never die, (they simply/just fade away). From a Great War soldiers' song; the phrase was most notably referred to by U.S. General Douglas MacArthur (1880–1964) in his farewell address to the Congress.
 Once a(n) _, always a(n) _
 Once bitten, twice shy
 One good turn deserves another
 Once the poison, twice the charm
 One half of the world does not know how the other half lives
 One hand washes the other
 One kind word can warm three winter months
 One man's meat is another man's poison
 One man's trash is another man's treasure
 One might as well be hanged for a sheep as a lamb
 One might as well throw water into the sea as to do a kindness to rogues
 One law for the rich and another for the poor
 Opportunity does not knock until you build a door
 One swallow does not make a summer
 One who believes in Sword, dies by the Sword
 One who speaks only one language is one person, but one who speaks two languages is two people. Turkish Proverb
 One year's seeding makes seven years weeding
 Only fools and horses work
 Open confession is good for the soul.
 Opportunity never knocks twice at any man's door
 Other times other manners.
 Out of sight, out of mind
 Out of the frying pan and into the fire
 Out of the mouths of babes (and sucklings)
 Over greedy man, over wrathful woman will never flourish

P
 Parsley seed goes nine times to the Devil
 Patience is a virtue
 Pearls of wisdom
 Penny wise and pound foolish
 Penny, Penny. Makes many.
 People who live in glass houses should not throw stones
 Physician, heal thyself
 Possession is nine-tenths of the law
 Power corrupts; absolute power corrupts absolutely
 Practice makes perfect
 Practice what you preach
 Preaching to the choir
 Prevention is better than cure
 Pride comes/goes before a fall (O.T.),
 Procrastination is the thief of time
 Putting the cart before the horse
 Put your best foot forward
 Put your money where your mouth is

R
 Red sky at night shepherds delight; red sky in the morning, shepherds warning
 Respect is not given, it is earned.
 Revenge is a dish best served cold
 Revenge is sweet
 Rome was not built in one day
 Right or wrong, my country
 Rules were made to be broken.

S
 See a pin and pick it up, all the day you will have good luck; See a pin and let it lay, bad luck you will have all day
 See no evil, hear no evil, speak no evil
 Seeing is believing
 Seek and ye shall find
 Set a thief to catch a thief
 Shiny are the distant hills
 Shrouds have no pockets
 (Speech is silver but) Silence is golden
 Slow and steady wins the race
 Slow but sure
 Smooth move
 Snake in the grass
 Softly, softly, catchee monkey
 Some are more equal than others (George Orwell, Animal Farm)
 Sometimes we are the student. Sometimes we are the master. And sometimes we are merely the lesson – Jacalyn Smith
 Spare the rod and spoil the child
 Speak as you find
 Speak of the devil and he shall/is sure/will appear
 Speak softly and carry a big stick
 Sticks and stones may break my bones, but words will never hurt me
 Still waters run deep
 Strike while the iron is hot
 Stupid is as stupid does
 Success has many fathers, while failure is an orphan
 (A) swarm in May is worth a load of hay; a swarm in June is worth a silver spoon; but a swarm in July is not worth a fly

T
 Take care of the pennies, and the pounds will take care of themselves
 Talk is cheap
 Talk of the Devil, and he is bound to appear
 Talk of Angels, and hear the flutter of their wings
 Tell me who your friends are, and I'll tell you who you are
 Tell the truth and shame the Devil (Shakespeare, Henry IV),
 The age of miracles is past
 The apple does not fall/never falls far from the tree
 The best defence is a good offence
 The best-laid schemes of mice and men often go awry
 The best things in life are free
 The bigger they are, the harder they fall
 The boy is father to the man
 The bread never falls but on its buttered side
 The child is the father of the man
 The cobbler always wears the worst shoes
 The comeback is greater than the setback
 The course of true love never did run smooth
 The customer is always right
 The darkest hour is just before the dawn
 The Devil finds work for idle hands to do
 The Devil looks after his own
 The die is cast
 The early bird catches the worm
 The end justifies the means
 The enemy of my enemy is my friend
 The exception which proves the rule
 The female of the species is more deadly than the male
 The good die young
 The grass is always greener (on the other side) (of the fence)
 The hand that rocks the cradle rules the world
 The husband is always the last to know
 The innocent seldom find an uncomfortable pillow. William Cowper, English poet (1731–1800)
 The labourer is worthy of his hire
 It is the last straw that breaks the camel's back
 The law is an ass. From English writer Charles Dickens' novel Oliver Twist
 The leopard does not change his spots
 The left hand doesn't know what the right hand is doing
 The light is on but nobody is home
 The longest day must have an end
 The longest journey starts with a single step
 The Moon is made of green cheese
 The more the merrier
 The more things change, the more they stay the same
 The only disability in life is a bad attitude. Scott Hamilton
 The only way to understand a woman is to love her
 The old wooden spoon beats me down
 The only way to find a friend is to be one
 The pen is mightier than the sword
 The pot calling the kettle black
 The proof of the pudding is in the eating
 The road to Hell is paved with good intentions
 The shoemaker's son always goes barefoot
 The squeaky wheel gets the grease
 The streets are paved with gold
 The way to a man's heart is through his stomach
 The work praises the man.
 There ain't no such thing as a free lunch
 There are more ways of killing a cat than choking it with cream
 There are none so blind as those who will not see  attributed variously to Edmund Burke or George Santayana
 There are two sides to every question
 There but for the grace of God go I
 There is an exception to every rule
 There are always more fish in the sea
 There is honour among thieves
 There is many a good tune played on an old fiddle
 There is many a slip 'twixt cup and lip
 There is more than one way to skin a cat
 There is no accounting for tastes
 There is no fool like an old fool
 There's no need to wear a hair shirt
 There is no place like home
 There is no shame in not knowing; the shame lies in not finding out.
 There is no smoke without fire/Where there is smoke, there is fire
 There is no such thing as a free lunch
 There is no such thing as bad publicity
 There is no time like the present
 There are none so deaf as those who will not hear
 There's nowt so queer as folk
 There is one born every minute
 There is safety in numbers
 They that sow the wind shall reap the whirlwind
 Third time is a charm
 Those who do not learn from history are doomed to repeat it  George Santayana
 Those who live in glass houses should not throw stones
 Those who know many languages live as many lives as the languages they know. Czech proverb
 Those who sleep with dogs will rise with fleas
 Time and tide wait for no man
 Time flies
 Time goes by slowly when your are living intensely
 Time is a great healer
 Time is money
 (Only) time will tell
 'Tis better to have loved and lost than never to have loved at all
 To be worn out is to be renewed. Lao Tzu, Chinese philosopher (604 BC – c. 531 BC)
 To each his own.
 To err is human, to forgive divine
 To learn a language is to have one more window from which to look at the world. Chinese proverb
 To the victor go the spoils
 To travel hopefully is a better thing than to arrive
 Tomorrow is another day
 Tomorrow never comes
 Too many cooks spoil the broth
 Too little, too late
 Too much of a good thing
 Truth is stranger than fiction
 Truth is more valuable if it takes you a few years to find it. Often attributed to French author Jules Renard (1864–1910)
 (The) truth will out
 Turn your face toward the sun and the shadows fall behind you.
 Two birds with one stone.
 Two can play at that game
 Two heads are better than one
 Two is company, but three is a crowd,
 Two wrongs (do not) make a right

U 
 Uneasy lies the head that wears a crown
 United we stand, divided we fall
 Use it or lose it
 Ugly is as ugly does
 Up a creek without a paddle
 Unity is strength

V
 Variety is the spice of life. William Cowper, English poet (1731–1800)
 Virtue is its own reward

W
 Walk softly but carry a big stick (26th U.S. President Theodore Roosevelt, 1900 in letter relating an old African proverb)
 Walls have ears
 Walnuts and pears you plant for your heirs
 Waste not, want not
 Well begun is half done
 What does not kill me makes me stronger
 Well done is better than well said
 What cannot be cured must be endured
 What goes around, comes around
 What goes up must come down
 What you lose on the swings you gain on the roundabouts
 What is sauce for the goose is sauce for the gander
 What the eye does not see (the heart does not grieve over)
 When in Rome, (do as the Romans do). St. Ambrose, 347 AD
 Whatever floats your boat
 When it rains it pours
 When life gives you lemons, make lemonade
 When the cat is away, the mice will play
 When the going gets tough, the tough get going
 When the oak is before the ash, then you will only get a splash; when the ash is before the oak, then you may expect a soak
 When you have seen one, you have seen them all
 What is learnt in the cradle lasts to the tombs
 What the eye does not see, the heart does not grieve over
 Where there is a will there is a way
 Where there is muck there is brass
 Where there is life there is hope
 Whether you think you can, or you think you can't, you're right
 While there is life there is hope
 Who will bell the cat?
 Whom the Gods love die young
 Why keep a dog and bark yourself?
 With great power comes great responsibility (often attributed to Marvel Comics superhero Spider-Man)
 Woman is the root of both good and evil
 Wonders will never cease
 Work expands so as to fill the time available
 Worrying never did anyone any good

Y
 You are never too old to learn
 You are what you eat
 You can have too much of a good thing
 You can lead a horse to water, but you cannot make it drink
 You can never/never can tell
 You cannot always get what you want
 You cannot burn a candle at both ends.
 You cannot have your cake and eat it too
 You cannot get blood out of a stone
 You cannot make a silk purse from a sow's ear
 You cannot make an omelette without breaking eggs
 You cannot make bricks without straw
 You cannot push a rope
 You cannot run with the hare and hunt with the hounds
 (You cannot) teach an old dog new tricks
 You cannot unscramble eggs
 You cannot win them all
 You catch more flies with honey than with vinegar
 You either die a hero or live long enough to see yourself become the villain
 You pay your money and you take your choice
 Youth is wasted on the young
 You may/might as well be hanged/hung for a sheep as (for) a lamb
 You must have rocks in your head
 You scratch my back and I will scratch yours
 You'll never get if you never go
 You've got to separate the wheat from the chaff
 You've made your bed and you must lie in/on it

Z
 Zeal without knowledge is fire without light

Notes

References

External links

 
 
 , list of proverbs, idioms and quotes
 

Lists of phrases
Oral tradition
 List